Karagümrük is a neighborhood in Fatih district of Istanbul, Turkey.

The neighborhood gives its name to a professional football club Fatih Karagümrük S.K., also called Karagümrükspor, that is based in the Karagümrük neighbourhood since 1926.

References

Neighbourhoods of Fatih